SVT Extra was a Swedish television channel owned and operated by Sveriges Television.

SVT Extra was started in 2002, using space preempted by the cancelling of SVT's regional channels. During its first year, it operated as a regular channel, providing extended coverage of several events and sports broadcasts. Towards the end of the year, its place was taken over by Barnkanalen and most sports broadcasts were shifted over to SVT24. SVT Extra did however return occasionally, such as for the 2004 Olympics when it provided extended coverage.

External links
www.svt.se

Sveriges Television
Defunct television channels in Sweden
Television channels and stations established in 2002
2002 establishments in Sweden